Rudolph Chester Yakym III (born February 24, 1984) is an American politician and businessman who is the member of the U.S. House of Representatives representing Indiana's 2nd congressional district. He is a member of the Republican Party.

Education 
Yakym earned an associate degree in business and a Bachelor of Science in finance and business administration from the Indiana University South Bend. In 2019, he earned a Master of Business Administration from the University of Notre Dame.

Career 
In 2010 and 2011, Yakym worked as a sales manager for Omnicity, a broadband company. In 2011 and 2012, he was the finance director for Jackie Walorski's congressional campaign. From 2013 to 2019, he was a vice president at the Bradley Company, a commercial real estate business. In 2015, then-Governor Mike Pence nominated Yakym to serve as a member of the Indiana Judicial Nominating Commission. Since 2019, Yakym has been the director of growth initiatives at Kem Krest, a logistics and supply chain organization.

U.S. House of Representatives 

After Walorski died in a car accident in August 2022, Yakym declared his candidacy in Indiana's 2nd congressional district special election to succeed her. He was selected as the Republican nominee by the district's GOP precinct committee members to serve both the remainder of Walorski's term and a full two-year term beginning in January 2023. Winning the nomination on the first ballot amid a field of 12 candidates, Yakym defeated contenders including former Indiana Attorney General Curtis Hill and state representatives Curt Nisly and Christy Stutzman. He defeated the Democratic nominee, Goshen teacher Paul Steury, and Libertarian nominee William Henry in the general election with over 64% of the vote.

Personal life 

Yakym is married to his wife, Sallyann, a teacher at Elkhart Christian Academy. They have three children. He is a practicing Baptist and serves as the head usher at the New Life Baptist Church in Osceola, Indiana.

Electoral history 
2022

References

External links
 Official website
 Campaign website

 

|-

1984 births
21st-century American politicians
Baptists from Indiana
Indiana Republicans
Indiana University South Bend alumni
Living people
Republican Party members of the United States House of Representatives from Indiana
University of Notre Dame alumni